Berastagia is a monotypic snout moth genus described by Rolf-Ulrich Roesler and Peter Victor Küppers in 1979. It contains the single species, Berastagia dissolutella, described by Pieter Cornelius Tobias Snellen in 1880. It is found in Australia.

References

Cryptoblabini
Monotypic moth genera
Moths of Australia
Pyralidae genera